The NCW Inter-Cities Heavyweight Championship a title contested in the Canadian wrestling promotion Northern Championship Wrestling.  It was first established in 1986 as the AWA (Amateur Wrestling Association) Heavyweight Championship when Rick Lawrence became the first champion.  It 1992 it became the NCW Inter-Cities Championship.

Title history

Combined reigns

See also
NCW Quebec Heavyweight Championship
NCW Triple Crown Championship

Inter-Cities Heavyweight Championship
Inter-Cities Heavyweight Championship
Heavyweight wrestling championships
1986 establishments in Quebec